Anthony Francis "Tony" Bogaert is a Canadian psychologist. He is a professor in both the Departments of Psychology and of Community Health Sciences at Brock University.

Research
Bogaert is known for studying multiple subjects related to human sexuality, including asexuality. He has also published studies examining the relationship between the number of brothers a man has and his sexual orientation. These studies have concluded that the more older brothers a man has, the more likely he is to be gay, and that this effect is due to prenatal factors, not environmental ones.

References

External links
Faculty page

Canadian psychologists
Living people
Academic staff of Brock University
Canadian sexologists
University of Western Ontario alumni
1963 births